was an author in Taishō and Shōwa period Japan.

Sonoike was born in Hirakawachō, Tokyo. His father was in the service of the Imperial Household Agency, and his grandfather was the appointive governor of Nara prefecture in the Meiji period. He left the Gakushuin Peers’ School to pursue a literary career and was one of the early members of the Shirakaba Society. His 1919 short story, Hitori Sumō influenced the writings of Kazuo Hirotsu. In his later years, he was considered a member of a conservative group, which included Tetsuro Watsuji, Saneatsu Mushanokōji and Michio Takeyama.

References
 Mortimer, Maya. Meeting the Sensei: The Role of the Master in Shirakaba Writers. Brill Academic Publishers (2000). 

20th-century Japanese novelists
Japanese male short story writers
People from Tokyo
1886 births
1974 deaths
20th-century Japanese short story writers
20th-century Japanese male writers